Jorge Arturo Agustín Medina Estévez (23 December 1926 – 3 October 2021) was a Chilean prelate of the Catholic Church who held senior positions both in his native country and in the Roman Curia. He was prefect of the Congregation for Divine Worship and the Discipline of the Sacraments from 1996 to 2002 and was made a cardinal in 1998. Beginning in 1985 he served as auxiliary bishop and then from 1987 bishop of Rancagua and then bishop of Valparaíso from 1993 to 1996.

As Cardinal Protodeacon, the longest serving cardinal of the order of cardinal deacons, he announced the election of Pope Benedict XVI to the world on 19 April 2005.

Early life and ordination
Medina was born in Santiago in 1926, and studied at the Pontifical Catholic University of Chile, where he received a bachelor's degree in the arts and biology, and the Major Seminary of Santiago. He was ordained a priest on 12 June 1954 by Bishop Pio Fariña Fariña, the vicar general and an auxiliary bishop of Santiago.

Church scholar
Earning a doctorate in theology in 1955, Medina taught philosophy and theology at the Major Seminary of Santiago and of the Pontifical Catholic University, respectively until 1965. He also served as a dean of the university, and as a peritus at the Second Vatican Council; for the latter he later received an honoris causa doctorate from the University of Notre Dame in 1996.

Bishop
Pro-Grand Chancellor of the Catholic University from 1974 to 1985, he was named titular bishop of Thibilis and auxiliary bishop of Rancagua on 18 December 1984. Medina was consecrated to the episcopate on 6 January 1985, by Pope John Paul II, with Cardinals Eduardo Martínez Somalo and Duraisamy Simon Lourdusamy acting as co-consecrators. He was made Bishop of Rancagua on 25 November 1987, and then Bishop of Valparaíso on 16 April 1993.

Pro-Prefect and Prefect
On 21 June 1996 Medina was appointed Pro-Prefect of the Congregation for Divine Worship and the Discipline of the Sacraments in Rome, being given the title of Prefect of the Congregation  from 23 February 1998 until his retirement on 1 October 2002.

Cardinal
Medina was created a Cardinal-Deacon in the consistory of 21 February 1998, with the title of San Saba.

Medina was one of the cardinal electors who participated in the 2005 papal conclave. Following the conclusion of the conclave, as Cardinal Protodeacon, the senior cardinal deacon, he announced to the world the election of Pope Benedict XVI. He was the first non-Italian to do so in centuries and the first Latin American. As protodeacon, Medina imposed the pallium on Pope Benedict XVI and was one of the three cardinals who made the public act of obedience to him at the papal inauguration.

In retirement he returned to Chile in order to work as a parish priest. In the same period he published many short works of a pastoral nature.

He died in Santiago on 3 October 2021.

Views
Medina was a man of controversial views. He was a supporter of the Chilean coup d'etat by General Augusto Pinochet and the regime it established. He was accused of having in his capacity as dean of the Pontifical Catholic University of Chile of being one of the main denouncers of students and teachers suspected of having communist or socialist affiliations, many of whom become disappeared detainees. He never acknowledged the human rights violations of Pinochet's regime, including those featured in the Rettig Report or the Valech Report.

In December 2008, at a Mass marking the second anniversary of the death of Pinochet, Medina condemned pop musician Madonna, who was appearing in Santiago. He said "The atmosphere in our city is pretty agitated because this woman is visiting and with incredibly shameful behavior provokes a wild and lustful enthusiasm."

Sexual abuse of minors by priests 
The prominent 80-year-old priest Fernando Karadima was found  guilty in January 2011 by the Congregation for the Doctrine of the Faith of having sexually abused minors and ordered to retire to a life of prayer and penitence and never to exercise the priesthood in public again, Karadima was then accused under Chilean civil law of sexual abuse of minors, Medina is reported to have said that he doubted that the cleric would be sent to prison, since homosexual activity was not a crime in Chilean civil law and use of the term "sexual abuse" could be questioned: "With all due respect to the laws of my country, a child of 8 or 9 is very different from a 17-year-old ... A 17-year-old youngster knows what he is doing." He also remarked that priests are not immune to the devil's works: "Any informed Christian knows we are prone to weakness because of our human fragility. The devil gets in where he can. Priests are not immune from his snares." He defended the canonical sanctions imposed on Karadima as being the heaviest that could be imposed short of laicization, and as having taken into account Karadima's age and merits.

One of Karadima's accusers called the cardinal's remark about 17-year-olds "an unwarranted attack". Another added that it was an attack not only on those who had denounced Karadima, but on all who were honestly looking for truth and justice for their lives. He regarded Medina's statements as "extremely suspicious, as if he wanted to diminish the outline of these grave actions, reducing the issue to homosexuality in a very silly manner, as if, furthermore, homosexuality and abuse were synonymous". The statements, he said, "were an attempt to free from responsibility someone who took advantage of his position of power over more vulnerable persons".

References

External links

 .

1926 births
2021 deaths
People from Santiago
Cardinals created by Pope John Paul II
Chilean cardinals
Protodeacons
Members of the Congregation for Divine Worship and the Discipline of the Sacraments
Participants in the Second Vatican Council
Second Vatican Council
Pontifical Catholic University of Chile alumni
Roman Catholic theologians 
 20th-century Roman Catholic theologians
 21st-century Roman Catholic theologians
20th-century Roman Catholic bishops in Chile
Roman Catholic bishops of Rancagua
Roman Catholic bishops of Valparaíso
University of Notre Dame people